This is a list of private schools in Long Beach, California.

Private primary schools
 Bethany School - PK-8 - Christian
 Bethany Lutheran School - PK-8 - Lutheran Church
 Holy Innocents Elementary School - K-8 - Roman Catholic
 Lakewood Christian Schools - PK-8 - Christian
 Los Altos Brethren School - PreK, K-6 - Bible Teaching Christian
 Maple Village Waldorf School - Parent/Toddler, PreK, K-8 - Private
 Oakwood Academy - PK-6 - Christian non-denominational
 Our Lady Of Refuge Elementary School - TK-8 - Roman Catholic
 St. Anthony Elementary School PK-8 - Roman Catholic
 St. Athanasius Elementary School - K-8 - Roman Catholic
 St. Barnabas Elementary School - TK-8 - Roman Catholic
 St. Cornelius Elementary School - K-8 - Roman Catholic
 St. Cyprian Elementary School - TK-8 - Roman Catholic
 St. Joseph Elementary School - K-8 - Roman Catholic
 St. Lucy's School - K-8 - Roman Catholic
 St. Maria Goretti Elementary School - K-8 - Roman Catholic
Success Work College Preparatory Academy K-12- Private
 Westerly School of Long Beach - K-8th Grade - Private

Private primary and secondary schools
 Accelerated Christian Academy - K-12 and Adult Learners - Private - Distance Learning
 Lakewood Christian Schools (Long Beach, California) - PK-12 - Baptist 
 Gethsemane Baptist Church School - K-12 - Baptist
 Pacific Baptist School - K-12 - Baptist
 Parkridge Private School - K-12 and Adults - Private - online
 Success Work College Preparatory Academy-K-12- Private http://www.successworkacademy.org
 Zinsmeyer Academy - 6-12 - Private (ChildNet Youth and Family Services)

Private secondary schools
 St. Anthony High School - 9-12 - Roman Catholic
 Success Work College Preparatory Academy- Private http://www.successworkacademy.org

References

Education in Long Beach, California
Private schools in California
Long Beach